Water Mill (also called Watermill) is a former Long Island Rail Road station on the Montauk Branch of the Long Island Rail Road. It was located at the end of a dead-end street off Montauk Highway in Water Mill, New York.

History
Water Mill station originally opened 1875 on the west side of Halsey Lane (now Old Mill Road), and served the Sag Harbor Branch. On June 1, 1895, the Long Island Rail Road built the Montauk Extension east of Bridgehampton, New York, transforming the line into the Montauk Branch. The station was moved to its current site in August 1903, and had a connecting road along the line to Deerfield Road which was eliminated sometime after the station was closed, but has since been rebuilt as the former station and surrounding land was converted (in the early 2010s) into an office complex. The station was closed in the 1940s, but continued to be used as a stop until 1968. Unlike the nearby Bridgehampton station, which was razed in 1964 and replaced with a shelter in 1968, Water Mill station continues to stand well after it was closed by the Long Island Rail Road, and operated as a restaurant for much of the late-20th Century. Today it serves as the office of a series of office condiminums.

References

External links
Babylon/Montauk Branch Stations (LIRR Unofficial History Website)

Railway stations in the United States opened in 1875
Railway stations closed in 1968
Former Long Island Rail Road stations in Suffolk County, New York
1875 establishments in New York (state)
1968 disestablishments in New York (state)
Southampton (town), New York